Nakhatrana is a panchayat village and headquarters for a taluka in the middle of Kutch, Gujarat, in India.

Nakhatrana got its name from a very famous tale when Paliwal Bramhins from Pali migrated to Kutch, the then ruler gifted greenest part of Kutch without any document,   'khat' in Gujarati. Joshi is the popular surname of Bramhins here

Demographics
In the 2011 census, the village of Nakhatrana had 17478. named Lakhiarviro (near present-day Nakhatrana) after his twin brother Lakhiar.[14]

Street food

A large village, it is famous for its spicy Dabeli snack and bangles. It is also famous for Spicy Onion Samosa

Education
K.V. High School is an old school with a history. Divine school, Uma high school, Archana St Xaviers, Keshav Saraswati Vidhya Madi r

The village contain 6 government primary school, 2 high schools, 4 private schools, 1 college and ITI. Nakhatrana is developing educational centre. Nakhatrana is located on National Highway 8.

Places of Attraction near Nakhatrana 

 Dhinodhar
 Chhari Dhandh
 Roha Fort
 Virani Moti
 Kheta Bapa Sthanak - Vithon
 Jakh Botera
 Hajipir
 Mata na Madh
Banni Wet Lands
 Desalpar 
Manjal
Nani Aral

References 

Villages in Kutch district